This is a list of award winners and league leaders for the Chicago White Sox professional baseball team.

Awards

Most Valuable Player
1959 – Nellie Fox
1972 – Dick Allen
1993 – Frank Thomas
1994 – Frank Thomas
2020 - Jose Abreu

Cy Young
1959 – Early Wynn (MLB)
1983 – LaMarr Hoyt (AL)
1993 – Jack McDowell (AL)

Rolaids Relief Man Award
1990 – Bobby Thigpen

Mariano Rivera AL Reliever of the Year Award
2021 – Liam Hendriks

Rookie of the Year
1951 – Orestes "Minnie" Miñoso (Sporting News)
1956 – Luis Aparicio
1963 – Gary Peters
1966 – Tommie Agee
1983 – Ron Kittle
1985 – Ozzie Guillén
2014 – José Abreu

Manager of the Year
1983 – Tony La Russa
1990 – Jeff Torborg
1993 – Gene Lamont
2000 – Jerry Manuel
2005 – Ozzie Guillén

Gold Glove Award
Pitcher
Jim Kaat [3] (1973, Twins-White Sox, 1974–75, White Sox)
Mark Buehrle [3] (2009–11)
Jake Peavy (2012)
Dallas Keuchel (2021)
Catcher
Sherm Lollar [3] (1957–59)
First base
Jim Spencer (1977)
Mike Squires (1981)
Second base
Nellie Fox [3] (1957, 1959–60)
Yolmer Sanchez (2019)
Third base
Robin Ventura [5] (1991–93, 1996, 1998)
Shortstop
Luis Aparicio [7] (1958–62, 1968, 1970)
Ozzie Guillén (1990)
Outfield
Jim Landis [5] (1960–64)
Tommie Agee (1966)
Ken Berry (1970)
Minnie Miñoso [2] (1957, 1960)
Luis Robert (2020)

Silver Slugger Award
DH
 Frank Thomas [2] (1991, 2000)
Harold Baines (1989)
Julio Franco (1994)
Catcher
Carlton Fisk [3] (1981, 1985, 1988)
First baseman
Frank Thomas [2] (1993–94)
José Abreu [3] (2014, 2018, 2020)
Second baseman
none
Third baseman
Joe Crede (2006)
Shortstop
Alexei Ramírez [2] (2010, 2014)
Tim Anderson (2020)
Outfielders
Albert Belle (1998)
Magglio Ordóñez [2]  (2000, 2002)
Jermaine Dye (2006)
Carlos Quentin (2008)
Eloy Jimenez (2020)

Edgar Martínez Award
Greg Luzinski (1981, 1983)
Harold Baines (1987, 1988)

MLB "This Year in Baseball Awards"

Note: These awards were renamed the "GIBBY Awards" (Greatness in Baseball Yearly) in 2010 and then the "Esurance MLB Awards" in 2015,

"GIBBY Awards" Best Rookie
 – Jose Abreu

World Series Most Valuable Player Award
 – Jermaine Dye

DHL Hometown Heroes (2006)
Frank Thomas — voted by MLB fans as the most outstanding player in the history of the franchise, based on on-field performance, leadership quality and character value

Baseball America All-Rookie Team
See: Baseball America#Baseball America All-Rookie Team
2011 – Chris Sale (RP; one of two)

Topps All-Star Rookie teams
 
J. C. Martin (1B)
Charley Smith (3B)
Floyd Robinson (OF)
 
Pete Ward (3B)
Al Weis (SS)
Gary Peters (LHP)
 
Tommie Agee (OF)
 
Walt Williams (OF)
 
Carlos May (OF)
 
Bucky Dent (SS)
 
Chet Lemon (OF)
 
Bill Nahorodny (C)
Bob Molinaro (OF)
 
Ross Baumgarten (LHP)
 
Britt Burns (LHP)
 
Ron Kittle (OF)
 
Ozzie Guillén (SS)
 
Dave Gallagher (OF)
 
Carlos Martinez (1B)
 
Robin Ventura (3B)
Scott Radinsky (LHP)
 
Ray Durham (2B)
 
Mike Caruso (SS)
Magglio Ordóñez (OF)
 
Chris Singleton (OF)
 
Miguel Olivo (C)
 
Tadahito Iguchi (2B)
 
Alexei Ramírez (2B)
 
Chris Getz (2B)
Gordon Beckham (3B)

Babe Ruth Award (postseason MVP)
2005 – Jermaine Dye

Sporting News Performance of the Decade  (2009)
Mark Buehrle's perfect game against Tampa Bay on July 23, 2009 (only pitcher with two no-hitters in the decade, including game on April 18, 2007)

Team award
 – American League championship
 – Baseball America Organization of the Year
 – William Harridge Trophy (American League champion)
 – Commissioner's Trophy (World Series)
2011 – Commissioner's Award for Philanthropic Excellence
2012 – Steve Patterson Award for Excellence in Sports Philanthropy

Team records

Minor-league system

MiLB Overall Starter of the Year

2009 – Daniel Hudson

Other achievements

Baseball Hall of Famers
See Chicago White Sox#Baseball Hall of Famers

Ford C. Frick Award recipients (broadcasters)
See Chicago White Sox#Ford C. Frick Award recipients

Retired numbers
See Chicago White Sox#Retired numbers

Chicagoland Sports Hall of Fame

See also
Baseball awards
List of MLB awards

Footnotes

Award Winners
Chicago White Sox